Klettwitz (Lower Sorbian: Klěśišća) is a German village of Brandenburg, belonging to the municipality of Schipkau, situated in the historical region of Lower Lusatia.

History
The village was first mentioned in 1370 with the name of Cleticz. From 1815 to 1947 it was part of the Prussian Province of Brandenburg. From 1952 to 1990 it was part of the Bezirk Cottbus of East Germany. Until December 31, 2001, it was an autonomous municipality merged into Schipkau.

Geography
Klettwitz, part of the Lower Lusatia region, is located close to the borders with Saxony, 2 km in north of Schipkau. It is 6 km far from Senftenberg, 50 from Cottbus and 63 from Dresden. It is served by the motorway A13, connecting Dresden with Berlin, at the exit nr. 15 ("Klettwitz").

Some municipal localities (Siedlungsgebiete) are part of the suburb of Klettwitz. They are  Herrnmühle (Knězny młyń, seat of the old hospital), Staudemühle (Pušćadłowe młyń), Treuhandsiedlung (Drjewojske sedlišćo) and Wilhelminensglück (Wilhelmincowy Gluki).

The Bergheider See is an artificial lake created in the pit left by the Klettwitz Nord mine.

Sport
Located close to Klettwitz it is the "EuroSpeedway Lausitz", a race track originally named "Lausitzring", opened in 2000.

Photogallery

References

External links

 Klettwitz page on Shcipkau municipal website 

Populated places in Oberspreewald-Lausitz
Villages in Brandenburg
1370s establishments in the Holy Roman Empire
1370 establishments in Europe